Anacostia Rail Holdings Company is a transportation development and consulting firm responsible for the operations of several railroads:
Chicago South Shore and South Bend Railroad
Gulf Coast Switching
Louisville and Indiana Railroad
New York and Atlantic Railway
Northern Lines Railway
Pacific Harbor Line

Founded in 1985, it is based at the Railway Exchange Building in Chicago, Illinois, and has an office in New York City.  

Anacostia Rail Holdings Company, formerly Anacostia & Pacific, has developed eight new U. S. railroads. In each case, the company negotiated the terms of acquisition, developed the business plan and recruited senior management.  Anacostia & Pacific also provides management consulting services, analyses and expert testimony. Its clients have included governmental agencies, class I and short line railroads and financial institutions.

References
 Anacostia Rail Holdings Company

United States railroad holding companies
Companies based in Chicago